Johnny Villarroel (born 5 April 1955) is a Bolivian footballer. He played in eight matches for the Bolivia national football team from 1981 to 1983. He was also part of Bolivia's squad for the 1983 Copa América tournament.

References

1955 births
Living people
Bolivian footballers
Bolivia international footballers
Association football midfielders
Sportspeople from Cochabamba